Kiang (variant spelling: Kian) was a historical kingdom in what is now the West African state of The Gambia and also the name of the region it covered. The area is now the districts of Kiang Central, Kiang East, and Kiang West in the Lower River Division of the present-day country. The Kiang West National Park is also on the territory of the former empire.

History

The kingdom was one of nine Mandinka states on the southern bank of the Gambia River in the early 19th century.

Reference
Arnold Gailey, Harry A. Hughes. Historical Dictionary of the Gambia. The Scarecrow Press, Inc., 1999, 

History of the Gambia